Sathuragiri Hills, also known as "Chathuragiri" or "Sundara Mahalingam", is a pilgrimage site located in madurai district and 10 km from Watrap, near Srivilliputhur, in the state of Tamil Nadu in South India. The hills are a part of the Western ghats.

There are a few specific  days when the general public is permitted to visit  the Sathuragiri Hills. These days include  new moon and full moon days and on two Pradhosham days . Visiting hours are between 6 a.m. and 4 p.m.

Origin of the name 
The name Sathuragiri originates from the words "Chathur" means "Four," and "Giri" means "Hill."  An alternative origin for the name is attributed to the fact that the hill is square-shaped and therefore known as "Chathuragiri." Sathuragiri is known as the Abode of God.

References

External links 
Chennai to Chathuragiri route map and distance
 http://www.sathuragiritemple.tnhrce.in
https://www.tripadvisor.in/HotelsNear-g2305754-d8321021-Sathuragiri_Shiva_Temple-Srivilliputhur_Virudhunagar_District_Tamil_Nadu.html

Madurai district
Hills of Tamil Nadu